Dudley Fairbridge Pope (28 October 1906 – 8 September 1934) was an English cricketer. A right-handed batsman, Pope was born in Barnes and is recorded in the 1911 Census as living in Richmond, Surrey at age four. He played 159 first-class matches for Essex and Gloucestershire between 1925 and his death in a car accident in 1934. He scored 6,557 runs at 26.33, including seven centuries, and formed a "solid professional nucleus" along with such players as Jim Cutmore, Laurie Eastman, Jack O'Connor, Jack Russell and Stan Nichols. In 1933 Pope, along with many of these players, scored over 1,000 runs, the first time six Essex batsmen had topped 1,000 in a season.

Notes

External links
 

1906 births
1934 deaths
English cricketers
Essex cricketers
Gloucestershire cricketers
Road incident deaths in England
People from Barnes, London
English cricketers of 1919 to 1945